Gol-e Yakh (Persian: گل‌یخ; Ice Flower, also Wintersweet) is the debut solo studio album by Iranian singer-songwriter and guitarist Kourosh Yaghmaei. The album was released in 1973 by Caltex in Iran and was produced by Yaghmaei. The song "Gol-e Yakh," a melancholic ballad about love that endures through the bitterest winters was Yaghmaei's debut single and a huge success more than five million copies sold in the domestic market. Since it was released, there have been many performances within and outside of Iran. It brought fame to Yaghmaei and was translated into and adapted for other languages. Backed with the single "Del Dareh Pir Misheh," an Iranian-style garage rock song. Both singles were released in Iran in 1973 by Ahang Rooz and on February 2, 2012, in United States by Now Again Records. The album was rereleased on October 21, 1991, by Caltex.

Background
The lyrics were written by Yaghmaei and Mahdi Akhavan Langeroudi, Yaghmaei's university friend and modern Persian poet.

Singles
In 1973, as Yaghmaei's first single "Gol-e Yakh" A-side 7" Single was released with "Del Dareh Pir Misheh" B-side by the Ahange Rooz record label. In the same year under the same lebel "Leila" / "Paeiz" was released. In 1974, "Hajme Khali" / "Akhm Nakon" and in 1975 "Saraabe Toe" / "Dar Enteha" was released by Ahange Rooz.

Track listing

In popular culture
The song "Gol-e Yakh" is sampled on several albums by various Western artists. The 2018 "Adam and Eve" on the album Nasir by American rapper Nas features the song as its main backing sample.

In 2005, Iranian drama film Gol-e Yakh directed by Kiumars Poorahmad was named after this song. The song was also featured in Desiree Akhavan's film Appropriate Behavior (2014).

References

Cite

External links
 

1973 debut albums
Kourosh Yaghmaei albums
Albums produced by Kourosh Yaghmaei
Caltex Records albums
Persian-language albums